Abd al-Rahman ibn Khalid ibn Musafir al-Fahmi was a governor of Egypt for the Umayyad Caliphate from 735 to 736.

A Qays Arab, Abd al-Rahman originally served as chief of police (sahib al-shurta) for al-Walid ibn Rifa'a al-Fahmi before himself succeeding to the governorship upon al-Walid's death in mid-735. He remained in office until a Byzantine sea attack in the following year caused several Muslims to be taken prisoner; as a result, the caliph Hisham ibn Abd al-Malik lost faith in his skill with military matters and replaced him with Handhala ibn Safwan al-Kalbi instead.

Notes

References
 
 
 

8th-century Arabs
Umayyad governors of Egypt
8th-century Umayyad governors of Egypt
Taba‘ at-Tabi‘in hadith narrators